Jose Perez Jr. (born September 15, 1985) is a former American football cornerback. He played college football at San Diego State University (SDSU). He was selected by the New York Yankees in the seventh round of the 2003 Major League Baseball Draft.

Early years
Jose Perez Jr. was born in North Carolina, and grew up in Oceanside, California and attended Oceanside High School. With the perennial powerhouse Oceanside Pirates he played middle linebacker in his freshman year before switching to wide receiver. He led his team to the CIF Championship. As a senior, he caught 57 passes for 1112 yards in earning all-county honors.

Professional baseball
Perez, one of California's top outfielders and wide receivers in high school, initially committed to attending SDSU, where he would play both college football under Tom Craft and college baseball under Tony Gwynn. However, Perez—who grew up a Yankee fan—instead accepted a six-figure bonus to play with Yankees. He played minor league baseball in the Yankee organization for three seasons before being released.

College football
Perez then joined SDSU's football team as a walk-on, where was converted from receiver to cornerback. Perez received an honorable mention for the All-Mountain West team in his senior year.

Professional football
Perez was signed by the Miami Dolphins as undrafted free agent in 2011, but was released in the preseason.

References

External links

San Diego State Aztecs bio

1985 births
Living people
Players of American football from North Carolina
Baseball outfielders
American football cornerbacks
Gulf Coast Yankees players
Staten Island Yankees players
San Diego State Aztecs football players
Miami Dolphins players
Sportspeople from Oceanside, California
People from Cherry Point, North Carolina